HR1 or similar terms may refer to:

 hr1, radio station in Hesse, Germany
 HR 1 (radio station), Croatian Radio's first channel
 HR 1 (star), an alternate designation for the star HD 3
 H.R. 1 (short for House of Representatives 1), an identifier for legislation considered by the United States House of Representatives
 Peugeot HR1, concept car
 VR Class Hr1, a Finnish locomotive